Scirpus radicans is a species of flowering plant belonging to the family Cyperaceae.

Its native range is Europe to Japan.

References

radicans